Mallakent (Kaitag: Маллаккент) is a rural locality (a selo) in Yangikentsky Selsoviet, Kaytagsky District, Republic of Dagestan, Russia. The population was 264 as of 2010. There are 3 streets.

Geography 
Mallakent is located 13 km northwest of Madzhalis (the district's administrative centre) by road. Chumli and Yangikent are the nearest rural localities.

Nationalities 
Dargins live there.

References 

Rural localities in Kaytagsky District